Khantora is a census town in Domjur CD Block of Howrah Sadar subdivision in Howrah district in the Indian state of West Bengal. It is a part of Kolkata Urban Agglomeration.

Geography
Khantora is located at

Demographics
As per 2011 Census of India Khantora had a total population of 6,547 of which 3,331 (51%) were males and 3,216 (49%) were females. Population below 6 years was 545. The total number of literates in Khantora was 5,362 (89.34% of the population over 6 years).

Khantora was part of Kolkata Urban Agglomeration in 2011 census.

 India census, Khantora had a population of 5,773. Males constitute 50% of the population and females 50%. Khantora has an average literacy rate of 77%, higher than the national average of 59.5%: male literacy is 82% and female literacy is 72%. In Khantora, 9% of the population is under 6 years of age.

Transport
Domjur Road railway station on Howrah-Amta line is the nearest railway station.

References

Cities and towns in Howrah district
Neighbourhoods in Kolkata
Kolkata Metropolitan Area